The Postal Corporation of Jamaica Ltd. is the national post office of Jamaica.

External links

Official website.

Communications in Jamaica

Jamaica